The 2022 Jackson State Tigers football team represented Jackson State University as a member of the East Division of the Southwestern Athletic Conference (SWAC) during the 2022 NCAA Division I FCS football season. Led by third-year head coach Deion Sanders, the Tigers played their home games at Mississippi Veterans Memorial Stadium in Jackson, Mississippi. Jackson State won their second straight SWAC East Division championship and their second straight SWAC title under Sanders leadership, finishing the regular season undefeated, 12–0. The Tigers played MEAC champion North Carolina Central in the 2022 Celebration Bowl in Atlanta. Sanders resigned as the team's head coach after winning the SWAC championship on December 3, 2022 to become the head coach of the Colorado Buffaloes of the Pac-12 Conference.

Previous season

The Tigers finished the 2021 season with a record of 11–2, 8–0 SWAC play to win the SWAC regular season championship and the West Division. The Tigers won SWAC Football Championship where they defeated Prairie View A&M. They were invited to the Celebration Bowl where they were defeated by MEAC champion South Carolina State.

Roster

Schedule

Game summaries

vs. Florida A&M

vs. Tennessee State

Grambling State

Mississippi Valley State

at Alabama State

at Bethune–Cookman

Campbell

Southern

at Texas Southern

vs. Alabama A&M

at Alcorn State

Southern (SWAC Championship)

vs. NC Central (Celebration Bowl)

References

Mississippi State
Jackson State Tigers football seasons
Southwestern Athletic Conference football champion seasons
Jackson State Tigers football